Luke Zimmerman (born September 11, 1980 in Evanston, Illinois, United States) is an American actor who is best known for his role as Tom Bowman on ABC Family's The Secret Life of the American Teenager.

Early life 
Zimmerman was born with Down syndrome. He played Romeo in the play Romeo and Juliet and performed in the 1990 television movie drama Daughter of the Streets, as Andrew, alongside Roxana Zal, Harris Yulin, and John Stamos.

In 2007, Zimmerman tried out for the role of Tom Bowman, Grace Bowman's adopted older brother on The Secret Life of the American Teenager, which began airing in July 2008. He also appeared on Glee in November 2013.

Personal life 

Zimmerman was a student at Performing Arts Studio West.

Filmography

External links 
http://abcfamily.go.com/abcfamily/path/section_Shows+Secret-Life-Of-The-American-Teenager/page_Luke-Zimmerman
http://www.imdb.com/name/nm0956751/
http://www.backstage.com/bso/news-and-features-news/rising-to-the-challenge-1003985122.story

1980 births
Living people
Actors with Down syndrome
American male television actors